Luis Jhancarlos González Ortiz (born 14 March 1997) is a Colombian skateboarder, who took gold during 31st in Dew Tour Mens Street Open Qualifiers, ahead of American Jagger Eaton and compatriot Felipe Gustavo. He was a 15th Mens Street Qualifiers in the 2020 Summer Olympics.

References

1997 births
Living people
Colombian skateboarders
Sportspeople from Bogotá
Skateboarders at the 2020 Summer Olympics
Olympic skateboarders of Colombia
Competitors at the 2022 South American Games
South American Games medalists in roller sports
21st-century Colombian people
South American Games silver medalists for Colombia